Shakalaka Boom Boom is a 2007 Indian musical drama film directed and produced by Suneel Darshan and written by Anurag Kashyap. The film stars Bobby Deol, Upen Patel, Celina Jaitly and Kangana Ranaut in the lead. It released on 6 April 2007.

Shakalaka Boom Boom is based on conflicts and the power game involved in the functioning of the music industry. The film is loosely based on the Academy Award winning film Amadeus. The film was partly shot in South Africa.

Plot
Shakalaka Boom Boom follows the tale of a jealous, selfish and greedy music artist, Ayan Joshi aka AJ (Bobby Deol). AJ is one of the finest music artists in the industry and is currently under a stop since he can't think of a new project. AJ is in love with the hot and sexy Ruhi (Kangana Ranaut) and hopes to tell her how he feels. However, a wannabe singer, Reggie (Upen Patel) appears who falls in love with Ruhi and woos her before AJ can. 
Therefore, AJ swears to destroy Reggie's career and hence comes into Reggie's life as his friend. Getting him drunk, getting him smoking, is all that AJ has been doing to Reggie, and Reggie even loses control and passes out. One day, AJ finds out all Reggie's secrets and gets him so drunk that he has liver-fail. While Reggie was in the state of dying, AJ takes all his music-notes and beats and flees from the place. Then Ruhi shows up and takes him to the hospital. He is placed into the operation section due to liver failure, and then Ruhi plans to destroy AJ's career just like he did to Reggie.

Though Ruhi does not know that AJ isn't alone, he also has his hidden agenda with Reggie's ex-girlfriend Sheena (Celina Jaitly) who is now a bigshot due to AJ. AJ and Sheena together publish Reggie's music as their own, and it goes onto becoming a big hit. At the music-signing, Ruhi gets her gun out, though it doesn't seem to work. She seems that's it, though Karma has a different plan in mind. Due to her gun not working, she leaves and as she leaves, a disco ball randomly falls on top of AJ's head. He is placed into the hospital, and the doctors declare him "deaf". The ending shows him going to hell, and Reggie waking up to a better life, as he and Ruhi have now proved that the music is really his.

Cast 
 Bobby Deol as A.J.
 Upen Patel as Reggie
 Celina Jaitly as Sheena
 Kangana Ranaut as Ruhi
 Asrani as Yogra
 Dalip Tahil as Kumar
 Anupam Kher as Reggie's Father
 Govind Namdev as Guru
 Vivek Vaswani as Vidyacharan Shukla
 Seema Rahmani as Seema

Soundtrack 

All songs  are composed by Himesh Reshammiya and lyrics are penned by Sameer.

Reception

Critical reception
Shakalaka Boom Boom attracted negative reviews from top critics of India. Mayank Shekhar of Hindustan Times rated the film with 1 out of 5 stars. Shakti Salgaokar of DNA gave movie a one and half stars and wrote in his review, "It's simple — sexual innuendo, potshots at popular films, bad mimicry, foreign locations, a generous dose of overacting, an item song and a gora villain. And as he magnificently presents the climax of the film. Spare us the comedy, please?" Nikhat Kazmi of Times of India said, "This one's definitely not for the fastidious, choosy viewer but for those who don't mind losing it for a bit, Shakalaka Boom Boom works like an average Bollywood musical. Performance-wise, it's one big circus with the guys hogging most of the limelight. The girls — Kangana and Celina — are mere confetti" and gave it 3 out of 5 stars. Taran Adarsh also gave it 3 out of 5 stars, saying "It's a well-crafted entertainer and lives up to the expectations of its target audience — the youth. At the box-office, its business at the multiplexes will help it generate good revenue, making it a profitable proposition for its investors."

References

External links 
 

2007 films
2000s Hindi-language films
Films scored by Himesh Reshammiya
Films directed by Suneel Darshan